Glycinol is a pterocarpan, a type of natural phenol. It is a phytoalexin found in the soybean (Glycine max). It is formed by the cyclisation of daidzein.

More recent literature supports that glycinol has potent phytoestrogenic activity.

The so-called osteogenesis that is causes is postulated to be a preventative factor for osteoporosis.

It can be synthethised chemically and possesses two chiral centers.

Glycinol is the direct precursor of glyceollins through the action of a prenyltransferase.

Experiments show that the 6a oxygen of glycinol is derived from molecular oxygen.

References 

Pterocarpans
Phytoalexins